Joseph-André Taschereau, (November 30, 1806–March 30, 1867), was a lawyer, politician, and lastly, a judge. He was born at Sainte-Marie, Quebec. The son of Thomas-Pierre-Joseph Taschereau was a quiet child who early in life discovered a passion for the law. He was educated at home and then articled and was admitted to the bar of Lower Canada in 1828 along with his brother Pierre-Elzéar Taschereau.

Joseph-André had less than a year of joint practice in Quebec City with his brother, Pierre-Elzéar, who in 1826 had inherited his father's seigneury, returned to the manor at Sainte-Marie. He continued his practice from 1830 to 1835 and then entered politics back in his home riding of Beauce. He was a maverick in the Taschereau clan, representing quite different points of view from his political relatives.

He was elected a member of the Legislative Assembly of Lower Canada from 1835 to 1838. In 1845, he won a by-election to become a member of the Legislative Assembly of the Province of Canada, filling the seat left vacant by the death of Pierre-Elzéar; he resigned when he was made a circuit judge in 1847. In 1857 he was named judge of the Quebec Superior Court for the District of Kamouraska, where he had gone to live in 1852. He died in Kamouraska, Quebec at the age of 60 years.

A bachelor, he devoted his life to politics and the law. As a lawyer and judge, Taschereau excelled and his achievements put him on a level with other notables in this remarkable family.

External links 
 
 1759: the conquest of Québec
 
 the Canadian Encyclopedia

1806 births
1867 deaths
Members of the Legislative Assembly of Lower Canada
Lawyers in Quebec
Judges in Quebec
French Quebecers
Joseph-Andre
Province of Canada judges
Members of the Legislative Assembly of the Province of Canada from Canada East